The 1954 Bathurst 100 was a motor race held at the Mount Panorama Circuit, Bathurst, New South Wales, Australia on 19 April 1954.
It was staged over 26 laps of the 3.7 mile circuit, a total distance of approximately 100 miles.
The race, which was open to 'racing cars of all powers', was contested on a handicap basis with the first car, the HRG of Eddie Senior, starting 17 minutes and 46 seconds before the last cars, the Maybach of Stan Jones and the Ferrari of Dick Cobden.

The race was won by Bill Clark driving a HRG, with the Scratch section (disregarding handicaps) won by Stan Jones driving a Maybach.

Race results

 Organiser: Australian Racing Drivers Club
 Attendance: more than 18,000
 Entries: 25
 Starters: 21
 Non-starters: 4
 Winner's average speed: 67.4 mph
 Fastest time: Stan Jones, 77 minutes 59 seconds (77.2 mph average speed)

References

Motorsport in Bathurst, New South Wales
Bathurst 100
April 1954 sports events in Australia